The 2015–16 Liga Bet season is the 60th season of fourth tier football in Israel.

League matches began on 2 October 2015 and ended on 19 April 2016, followed by promotion and relegation play-offs.

Tzeirei Kafr Kanna (champions of the North A division), F.C Haifa Robi Shapira (champions of the North B division), F.C. Bnei Jaffa Ortodoxim (champions of the South A division) and F.C. Dimona (champions of the South B division) won their divisional titles and promotion to Liga Alef.

The clubs ranked 2nd to 5th in each division entered a promotion play-off, at the end of which, Hapoel Umm al-Fahm (from the North section) and F.C. Tira (from the South section) met the teams ranked 14th in Liga Alef. F.C. Tira won their tie and was promoted to Liga Alef as well, while Hapoel Umm al-Fahm lost and remained in Liga Bet.

At the bottom, F.C. Pardes Hanna-Karkur (from North B division), Ironi Beit Dagan (from South A division) and Hapoel Rahat (from South B division) were automatically relegated to Liga Gimel. Hapoel Bnei Maghar (from North A division) folded during the season, leaving their respective divisions with 15 teams.

The clubs ranked 12th to 15th in each division entered a relegation play-off, at the end of which Ahi Bir al-Maksur (from North A division), Ihud Bnei Baqa (from North B division), Hapoel Tzafririm Holon (from South A division) and Hapoel Merhavim (from South B division) dropped to Liga Gimel as well.

Review and Events
 At the beginning of the season, Liga Bet clubs competed in the State Cup, the first four rounds played within each division as a league cup competition, with the divisional winner and runner-up qualifying to the nationwide sixth round. Ironi Bnei Kabul, F.C Haifa Robi Shapira, F.C. Roei Heshbon Tel Aviv and Bnei Yeechalal Rehovot had beaten their rivals in the finals, played between 16 October and 20 October 2015.
 On 8 January 2016, Bnei Maghar announced their resignation from the league, due to financial difficulties and lack of sufficient football stadium in Maghar.

North A Division

North B Division

South A Division

South B Division

Promotion play-offs

Northern Divisions

Hapoel Umm al-Fahm qualified to the promotion play-off match against 14th ranked club in Liga Alef North division, Maccabi Daliyat al-Karmel.

Southern Divisions

F.C. Tira qualified to the promotion play-off match against 14th ranked club in Liga Alef South division, Maccabi Amishav Petah Tikva.

Promotion play-off Matches

North section

Maccabi Daliyat al-Karmel remained in Liga Alef; Hapoel Umm al-Fahm remained in Liga Bet.

South Section

F.C. Tira Promoted to Liga Alef; Maccabi Amishav Petah Tikva relegated to Liga Bet.

Relegation play-offs

Northern divisions

North A division

Ahi Bir al-Maksur relegated to Liga Gimel

North B division

Ihud Bnei Baqa relegated to Liga Gimel

Southern divisions

South A division

Hapoel Tzafririm Holon relegated to Liga Gimel

South B division

Hapoel Merhavim relegated to Liga Gimel

References

External links
 The Israel Football Association 
 The Israel Football Association 
 The Israel Football Association 
 The Israel Football Association 

Liga Bet seasons
4
Israel